The Venerable  William Arthur Baker  was an eminent Anglican priest in the 20th century.

Baker was born in 1870, educated at Christ's College, Cambridge, and ordained in 1895. He was Assistant Chaplain at King William's College in the Isle of Man and then Curate of St Mary, Ely. After this he held incumbencies at Hapton, Bourn and Handsworth. He was Archdeacon of Sheffield from 1938 to 1943.
He died on 14 December 1950.

References

Alumni of Christ's College, Cambridge
20th-century English Anglican priests
Archdeacons of Sheffield

1870 births

1950 deaths